Namco Classic Collection is the title of the two arcade games that are compilations that contain original and "arrangement" versions of six of Namco's most popular video games:

Namco Classic Collection Volume 1 (1995) - Galaga, Xevious and Mappy
Namco Classic Collection Volume 2 (1996) - Pac-Man, Rally-X and Dig Dug

Bandai Namco Entertainment franchises

ja:ナムコクラシックコレクション